Sayyid Muhammad Ali Hosseini Shahrestani known as Hibatuddin Shahrestani, was an Iraqi Shiite cleric and an Islamic scholar and Mujtahid, Quran exegete.

Birth and lineage 
Hibatuddin Shahrestani was born in Samarra on the morning of 20 May 1884 (24th of Rajab 1301 AH). His father was Sayyid Hossein Haeri Kazemi, was a scholar and spent most of his time researching religious and spiritual issues. Sayyid Hossein Haeri Kazemi authored four books of "Al-Futuhat Al-Ghaybiyyah Fi Al-Khutum", "Al-Ahraaz", "Al-Adiyyah" and "Damu'ah Al-Sham'ah Fi Adiyyah Laylat Al-Jum'ah". Hibatuddin Shahrestani 's mother was Maryam from Sayyidahs of Isfahan and the children of Mirza Muhammad Mahdi Shahrestani. Hibatuddin Shahrestani 's lineage goes back to Zayd ibn Ali, the son of Ali ibn Husayn, through thirty intermediaries.

Educations and careers 
Shahrestani spent his childhood in Karbala. From the age of ten, he studied the basics and elementary Islamic courses. In addition to the common Arabic literary sciences (such as morphology, syntax, logic, meanings, expression, novelty), he learned the sciences of Arabic prosody, arithmetic, geometry, astronomy, history, Biographical evaluation, Fiqh, Hadith studies and Hadith terminology and graduated in them during 9 years. During this period, he also studied nations sects and creeds and philosophical and theological issues, and with the ability to write at this age, he wrote books in these sciences in prose. His father, Sayyid Hossein Haeri Kazemi, died in February 1902 (Dhu al-Qadah of 1319 AH) at the age of seventy. At the age of nineteen, shortly after the death of his father, he left Karbala for Najaf on 23 November 1902 (21 Sha'ban of 1320 AH). In Najaf, he benefited from the school of masters such as Muhammad Kadhim Khorasani, Mohammed Kazem Yazdi and Fethullah Qa'ravi Isfahani. In 1905 (1323 AH), he began to learn under Mohammad Bagher Estahbanati and benefited from his lessons. In the same period, he authored the book "Adaae al-Farz fi Sokoun al-Arz". Shortly afterwards, he became acquainted with new astronomical knowledge. He pursued this knowledge and decided to write the book "Naqz al-Farz fi Isbaat Harakah al-Arz". After a while in 1906, he began to write the book "Al-Hey'ah va al-Islam" and introduced his new theories of astronomy according to Islamic sciences in it. It was a philosophical-political treatise that dealt with the harmonization of Islamic law with some aspects of Western civilization and culture, namely scientific discoveries, especially the science of the astronomy and new philosophies. Of course, he relied mainly on Islamic law and heritage. It probably took until 1912 to write it. Shahrestani continued his religious studies in the Najaf seminary and finally he became one of the Shiite mujtahids.

In addition to conventional Islamic sciences, he also studied new sciences. Shahrestani was known from his youth as a bright, wise, diligent and aware of new and reformist ideas. From the very beginning, he established intellectual relations with famous Sunni scholars and thinkers, including Egyptian Mufti Muhammad Abduh, Rashid Rida editor-in-chief of Al-Manār magazine, and with the publishers and writers of Al-Muqtataf and Al-Hilal magazines. He established a strong link between the scientific base of the Shiite world and the cultural centers of Egypt and Syria, and as a result, his articles, poems and reports were published in the magazines of the Arab world.

He put the teaching of philosophy and abandoned intellectual knowledge in Islamic seminaries on the agenda and in his various lectures and writings, he called on students and the people to learn new sciences.

Socio-political activities 
 Establishment of "Islah" Islamic School in Bahrain
 Establishment of "Islam" School in Bahrain
 Establishment of an "Invitation House of Islam" in Bahrain, this center was established in contrast to the invitations of Christian missionaries in Bahrain

Shahrestani, went to Bahrain in August 1912 (Ramadan of 1330 AH) and researched Christian missionaries claims and organization, and then established two new Islamic schools called "Islah" and "Islam" for the education of children and adolescents. In addition, he gave speeches and formed various Islamic associations, and finally thwarted all the efforts of Christian missionaries.

 Support of Muslims in India for their independence

He left Bahrain for India because the Muslims of India were under great political-cultural pressure from Britain, the extremist Hindus, and the petrified scholars there. In that country, he gave lectures and published articles in various magazines and founded several Islamic associations and decided to travel to Japan, but with the beginning of World War I in July 1914 (Ramadan of 1332 AH), he gave up that work and went to Yemen and from there to Hejaz and then returned to Najaf. He wanted to unite all Islamic organizations and associations by establishing a central association in Najaf and establish an active link between them, but these efforts failed as World War I continued.

 Active participation in the establishment of "Al-Murshid" Magazine
 Support of Persian Constitutional Revolution

In 1906 (1324 AH), during the Iranian constitutional movement, in addition to publishing articles and giving speeches in support of it, he participated in overt and covert meetings of constitutionalists.

 The publication of "Al-Ilm" magazine

Shahrestani began publishing "Al-Ilm" magazine in 1910 (1328 AH) in Najaf, which lasted for almost two years. It is said that the corrective approach of this magazine was unprecedented in Najaf seminary until that time, and for this reason, there were written conflicts between him and Abd al-Husayn Sharaf al-Din al-Musawi.

 Establishment of "Al-Jawadain" Public Library next to the Al-Kadhimayn Shrine in 1941 (1360 AH).
 Struggle against colonial governments during World War I
 Establishing an inseparable link and coordination between Shiite and Sunni cultural centers in Iraq, Egypt and Syria

Responsibilities 
 Ministry of Education of Iraq

In 1921 (1339 AH), he was elected as Minister of Education of Iraq, but due to the measures he took to reform the education system, was not favored by the government of the time, so he resigned from this position in 1922 (1340 AH). The term of Shahrestani's ministry lasted about eleven months. However, he was engaged in research and writing. Some of the reforms he made during this time are:

 President of the Supreme Court of Iraq called "Tamyeeze Jafari" for eleven years

In 1924 (1342 AH), by the order of the Iraqi government and the emphasis of the scholars of the time, he took over the presidency of the Supreme Court of Iraq, which became known later as the "Tamyeeze Jafari" parliament. Efforts to organize legal courts and link them to the Supreme Court, selecting competent judges, verdicts definition, and setting the necessary rules of trial procedure are part of the actions of Shahrestani in this position.

 Representation of the National Assembly of Iraq

In 1933 (1352 AH), at the request of the people of Baghdad, Shahrestani was elected as one of the members of the National Assembly of Iraq until the dissolution of the Assembly.

Reforms and measures for Muslims unity 
Shahrestani went to India to propagate the Islam religion. He planned to go to Japan to propagate the Islam after meeting with India's scholars and forming a religious association, but his meeting with Jalaluddin Kashani changed his course. Jalaluddin Kashani who was the author of Habl al-Matin magazine, considered the trip to Japan ineffective. Hence, Shahrestani went to Yemen and from there traveled to Hejaz, Syria, Lebanon, Iran and then returned to Najaf. He planned to form a religious association in each land and link it with the central association of Najaf. So that in critical situations, these centers can take action and protect the boundaries of belief and religion.

Defending Iraq 
In 1914 (1332 AH), during the First World War, Shahrestani along with clerics such as Fethullah Qa'ravi Isfahani, Muhammad Kadhim Khorasani and Seyyed Mostafa Kashani, raised the flag of Imam Ali Shrine and went to the front to defend the country. He also took an active part in the Iraqi Shiite struggle and played an effective and constructive role in the victory of the Iraqi revolt of 1920 and the independence of the country, for which he was imprisoned for a time in the city of Hillah.

Shahrestani was one of the leaders of the struggle in the Iraqi revolution. From the early of 1905 (1323 AH) to the end of February 1916 (Rabiʽ al-Thani 1334 AH), he traveled across the country for coordination against the enemies of Iraq, during this time he traveled from the Euphrates shores to Basra and from the Tigris shores to Kut-al-Imara. And he always tried to attract the believing popular forces. In 1920 (1338 AH) he joined the Iraqi revolution and under the leadership of Ayatollah Mirza Taqi al-Shirazi fought against the enemies of the country and the western colonizers. In the midst of this battle, Mirza Taqi al-Shirazi passed away and  Shahrestani was arrested and taken prisoner with another group and sentenced to death in a general court of war. Nine months had passed since his arrestment until in 1921 (1339 AH) when the British government issued a general amnesty order and he was released from prison.

Activities chronology 
Here are the chronology of his life and his most important activities:

 May 20, 1884 (24 Rajab 1301 AH): His birth.
 1893 (1311 AH): Start studying in Islamic schools in Karbala.
 February 1902 (Dhu al-Qadah 1319 AH): The death of his father.
 November 23, 1902 (21 Sha'ban 1320 AH): Emigration from Kadhimiya and Karbala to Najaf to continue his education.
 December 1902 (Ramadan 1320 AH): trip to Bahrain.
 December 1902 (Ramadan 1320 AH): Establishment of two schools of "Islah" and "Islam" in Bahrain.
 1905 (1323 AH): Study under Mohammad Bagher Estahbanati.
 1905 (1323 AH): Compilation of the book "Adaae al-Farz fi Sokoun al-Arz"
 1906 (1324 AH): Participate in the meetings of Iranian constitutionalists in Najaf and work for it.
 1906 (1324 AH): Compilation of the book "Naqz al-Farz fi Isbaat Harakah al-Arz"
 November 1906 (Ramadan 1324 AH): The beginning of writing the book "Al-Hey'ah va al-Islam"
 1910 (1328 AH): Publication of religious, philosophical and scientific monthly "Al-Ilm" magazine.
 September 1912 (Shawwal 1330 AH): The establishment of the "Society of the Staff of Islam" in Baghdad. 
 October 1912 (Dhu al-Qadah 1330 AH): The establishment of the "Islamic Society".
 December 1912 (Muharram 1331 AH): The establishment of the "Reform Society" in Bahrain.
 1912 (1331 AH): The establishment of the "Union of Scholars" in Oman.
 February 1913 (Rabiʽ al-Awwal 1331 AH): Travel to India and warm welcome of people and officials.
 February 1913 (Rabiʽ al-Awwal 1331 AH): The guidance of the people of India and the fight against superstition and heresy. 
 February 1913 (Rabiʽ al-Awwal 1331 AH): The establishment of the "Allah's Recruit Society" in Kolkata, India.
 April 1913 (Jumada al-awwal 1331 AH): The establishment of "Ale-Muhammad Society" in Al Bahah.
 May 1913 (Jumada al-Thani 1331 AH): The establishment of "Islamic Publication Society" in Allahabad.
 July 1913 (Sha'ban 1331 AH): The establishment of "Reinforcement Society" in Jabis.
 November 1913 (Dhu al-Hijjah 1331 AH): The establishment of "Society of the People of Truth" in Yemen.
 November 1913 (Dhu al-Hijjah 1331 AH): Go to Hajj pilgrimage.
 November 1913 (Dhu al-Hijjah 1331 AH): Compilation of the book "Ad'iyat al-Quran".
 November 1913 (Dhu al-Hijjah 1331 AH): Travel to Syria, Lebanon, Iran and Basra. 
 1914 (1332 AH): Travel to Yemen.
 December 1914 (Muharram 1333 AH): Issuing the fatwa of jihad against Britain, France and Russia.
 December 11, 1914 (23 Muharram 1333 AH): Announcing his fatwa in mosques and inviting people to participate in the jihad.
 November 29, 1915 (21 Muharram 1334 AH): The arrival of the legion of volunteers against colonialism led by Hibatuddin Shahrestani to Baghdad.
 1920 (1338 AH): The establishment of the secret organization "Islamic National Assembly" against the British colonizers.
 May 30, 1921 (22 Ramadan 1339 AH): The issuance of the death sentence against Hibatuddin Shahrestani for his struggles.
 1921 (1339 AH): Release from the jail after nine months of captivity. 
 1921 (1339 AH): Release from prison and execution for general amnesty. 
 September 28, 1921 (25 Muharram 1340 AH): Appointed to the Ministry of Education of Iraq.
 August 14, 1922 (20 Dhu al-Hijjah 1340 AH): Resignation from the Ministry of Education of Iraq.
 August 14, 1923 (1 Muharram 1342 AH): Accepting the presidency of the "Jafari Shiite Assembly".
 1924 (1342 AH): Accepting the presidency of the Supreme Court of Iraq "Tamyeeze Jafari".
 1924 (1342 AH): Eye disease and impaired vision and the onset of low vision and then blindness.
 December 1925 (Jumada al-awwal 1344 AH): Establishment of "Al-Murshid Magazine" in Baghdad.
 1926 (1345 AH): Eye surgery and temporary recovery.
 1930 (1349 AH): A trip to Syria for eye treatment.
 1934 (1353 AH): Resignation from the Supreme Court of Iraq "Tamyeeze Jafari".
 1934 (1353 AH): Participate in the National Assembly elections of Iraq.
 1934 (1353 AH): Elected by the people of Baghdad to represent the parliament.
 February 1935 (Dhu al-Qadah 1353 AH): Withdrawal from the parliament due to the crisis and the dissolution of the parliament.
 1935 (1354 AH): Beginning of the establishment of "Al-Jawadain Public Library" next to the Al-Kadhimayn Shrine.
 February 7, 1967 (26 Shawwal 1386 AH): His death.

Works 
Shahrestani's writings and works amount to over one hundred volumes of books and treatises in various Islamic sciences and fields in Arabic and Persian languages. Elsewhere, the number of his writings is mentioned as more than three hundred and fifty volumes. The names of some of which are given here.

Quranic 
 Al-Mohit: It is an extended Tafsir of Quran in eight large volumes written in a new way but is incomplete.
 Hujjat al-Islam: The summary of the book "Al-Mohit" mentioned above.
 Siraj al-Miraj: In interpreting the Quran verses of Mi'raj and solving its issues.
 Tafsir Surah Waqi'a: Tafsir of Waqi'a Surah. An important part of it has been published in the monthly "Al-Murshid" in Baghdad.
 Resaleh Dhu al-Qarnayn: Which is written to solve the issues of the Quran verses about the story of Dhu al-Qarnayn.
 Sadde Yajoj va Majoj: Which is written to solve the issues of the Quran verses about the story of Gog and Magog.
 Al-Jame'at al-Islamiyah va al-Aqaid al-Quraniyah: In proving the five principles of the Shia Islam religion with Quranic verses.
 Al-Tafsir al-Yasir le-Surat al-Fatihah wa Jazai Tabaarak wa Am min Kitab al-Ali al-Qadir
 Sirr Tashabuh al-Quran
 Al-Moejizat al-Khalidah

Theology and philosophy 
 Al-Intiqad Hawli Tashih al-Itiqad: A part of this book has been published in "Al-Murshid" monthly, but it is unfinished.
 Al-Ma'arif al-Aaliah lel-Madaaris al-Iraqiyah: It is a religious, scientific and philosophical textbook for Iraqi schools that only the first volume has been published.
 Dein al-Bashar fi al-Tariqat al-Saalehah le-Sair al-Insan
 Al-Rouhiaat: Which is also called Al-Kitab al-Maftouh ila Awaalim al-Rouh 
 Al-Imamah va al-Ummah
 Al-Fareq fi Foraq al-Islam
 Mavaahib al-Moshaahid fi Wajibaat al-Aqayid: It is a poetic work in theology.
 Nazm al-Aqayid: Summary of the book "Mavaahib al-Moshaahid fi Wajibaat al-Aqayid" mentioned above.
 Towhid Ahl al-Towhid: This book proves the principles of Islamic beliefs only with Quran verses and rational arguments.
 Fayz al-Baari aw Islah Manzumat al-Sabzavari va Hiya Usul al-Falsafat al-Aliyah: It is a book on the refinement of Hadi Sabzevari's book "Šarḥ al-Manẓuma".
 Al-Qout va al-Malakout: In proving monotheism.
 Al-Jabr va al-Ikhtiar
 Al-Shia va al-Nasebiah
 Ta'aliqah ala al-Nokat al-Itiqadiyah: Comments on the book "Nokat al-Itiqadiyah" by Al-Shaykh Al-Mufid, which has been published in Tehran.
 Zikri al-Soufiah: It is a poetic work in rejection of Sufism.
 Holoul al-Holoul: In rejection of Sufism.
 Al-Marjaniyah fi Talkhis al-Manzumat al-Itiqadiyah
 Falsafeh al-Istikmaal va Usulihaa
 Hadith ma'a al-Duat al-Burutestaniyayn
 Al-Radd ala al-Babiyah
 Al-Qaliyah fi Radd al-Moqaliyah

Jurisprudence and principles 
 Fayz al-Saahil va Ojoubat Masa'il Ahl al-Sawahil
 Tahrim Naql Al-Jana'iz al-Motaqayerah: It is a revised treatise that has been published several times. Abd al-Husayn Sharaf al-Din al-Musawi has written the book "Boqyat al-Fa'iz fi Jawaz Naql al-Jana'iz" in rejection of this book.
 Yaqut al-Nahr fi Miqat al-Bahr
 Kitab fi Ahkaam Ahl al-Kitab
 Hikmat al-Ahkaam: Which discusses the philosophy of legislation and still unfinished.
 Horiat al-Fikr bel-Ijtihad: Which is not completed.
 Al-Takattof va al-Isbaal
 Dalil al-Qazaah: Which is two volumes.
 Hokumat al-Haqq: About the laws of European wisdom and their social rules and its adaption to the religion of Islam.
 Al-Fayyaz Hawaash Ala al-Riyaz: Not yet gathered.
 Fiqh Hay: Which is not completed.
 Resaleh ee dar Sowm
 Resalah fi Wojoub Salah al-Jum'ah
 Al-Azwaaj al-Mowaqqat
 Weqayah al-Mahsoul fi Sharhi Kifayat al-Osoul: In this book, the lectures of Muhammad Kadhim Khorasani gathered.
 Al-Wuquf ala Ahkam al-Awqaaf
 Minhaaj al-Haaj aw Manaasik Ale Muhammad
 Asfi al-Mashaarib fi Hokam Haliq al-Lahiyat va Tatwil al-Shaarib
 Al-Tanabboh fi Tahrim al-Tashabboh
 Qaab Qawsayn fi al-Salaat inda al-Qutbayn
 Fath al-Baab le-Taqbil al-Ietaab
 Al-Hajj al-Mokhattar, Javaab al-Saailin an el-Hajj fi Soltat al-Wahabiyayn
 Raahnamaye Yahud va Nasaaraa: ya Bibleha

History 
 Sirah Khayrah al-Bashar: Which is in the history of Islam prophet Muhammad ibn Abdullah in a strange way that leads the reader to the conclusion of acknowledge Muhammad's mission.
 Ketab Amir al-Momenin Ali (a): Which is in the history and virtues of Imam Ali.
 Nihzat al-Husayn: In the history of Imam Hussein. The first edition was published in 1926 (1345 AH) and has been reprinted many times since then. This book has been translated into English and Persian, which was translated into Persian by Alireza Hakim Khosravi and is called "Azemate Hossein".
 Mokhtasar Nihzat al-Husayn: Summary of the book "Nihzat al-Husayn" mentioned above.
 Al-Masnoue fi Naqdi Iktifa al-Qonoue bima Howa Matboue
 Al-Khaybah fi al-Shoaybiah: Which has also been translated into Turkish.
 Kitab Zayd al-Shahid
 Al-Tamhid fi Zayd al-Shahid
 Siqaat al-Ruwaat
 Al-Riwayat
 Solalah al-Saadaat: Which is unfinished.
 Solalah al-Saadaat fi Ansaab al-Buyut al-Shahirat min al-Itrat al-Tahirah
 Al-Sham'ah fi Haal Zid al-Dam'ah
 Tajomeh Jabir ibn Hayyaan al-Soufi al-Kimiawi: In 1925 (1343 AH), part of it was published in the monthly "Islah" in Baghdad.
 Tayye al-Awaalim fi Ahwaal Sheikh al-Mulla Kazim: The important part of this book was published in "Al-Ilm" monthly in 1911 (1329 AH).
 Zowi al-Ma'aali fi Zoriyah Abi al-Ma'aali
 Sadaf al-Le'aali fi Shajareh Abi al-Ma'aali
 Al-Nobakhtiyah: Which is in the history of "Nawbakht" family.
 Al-Ilaqiyah
 Silsilat al-Zahab: A poetic work in the history of "Shahrestani" family.

Mathematics and astronomy 
 Al-Hey'ah va al-Islam: In Arabic and in charge of adapting the new astronomy sciences to the appearances of Islamic laws, it was published in Baghdad and its Persian translation was published in Najaf.
 Fazaalik al-Mohaasib
 Feisal ol-Dalaael: The answer to the questions asked by "Faisal", the son of the king of Muscat and the Imam of Oman.
 Adaae al-Farz fi Sokoun al-Arz
 Mawaqe al-Nojoum fi Tahqiq al-Samaae al-Dunya va al-Rujum
 Naqz al-Farz fi Isbaat Harakah al-Arz
 Zinat al-Kawaakib fi Hey'at al-Afalaak va al-Sawaaqib: Part of which was published in the first year of the monthly "Al-Ilm" and is still unfinished.
 Al-waafi al-Kaaf ya Sharhi Jabal Qaaf: In the history of Mount Qaf, published by the office of "Al-Murshid" magazine in Baghdad.
 Al-Shariat va al-Tabiat: Which adapts the naturalities sciences of that age to the appearances of the Islamic laws.

Literary sciences 
 Rawaashih al-Foyuz fi Ilm al-Uruz: Which was published in 1916 (1334 AH) in Tehran with the book "Mavaahib al-Moshaahid fi Wajibaat al-Aqayid" in one edition.
 Tahawwul al-Ajamah va al-Arubah: It is in the expression of words that have been quoted from Persian to Arabic and from Arabic to Persian.
 A collection containing the following treatises:
 Risaalah Aqd al-Habaab: A poetic work about Arabs.
 Al-Dorr va al-Marjaan: A poetic work in the science of semantics and eloquence. 
 Risaalah al-Awraaq fi al-Ishtiqaaq
 Risaalah al-Sirr al-Ajib fi Talkhis Mantiq al-Tahzib
 Risaalah Qilaadah al-Nahur fi Awzaan al-Bahur
 Natijat al-Mantiq: In Persian language.
 Motun al-Fonun
 Nadirah al-Zamaan fi Dilaalah al-Fiel ala al-Zamaan

Miscellaneous 
 Fiqan Islam: It was written in India and published in 1913 (1331 AH).
 Azraar al-Tadkhin: Which was published in 1925 (1343 AH) in Baghdad.
 Azraar al-Tadkhin ya Sharab al-Dokhan fi Nazar al-Tib Walidayn
 Fazayel al-Faras: In expressing the virtues of Iranians.
 Al-Faraayid: Which is in several volumes.
 Al-Manaabir: It is a Persian book and has been written for preachers.
 Jadawil al-Riwayat
 Anis al-Jalis: Which remains unfinished.
 Anis al-Jalis fi al-Montakhab min Kolli Muzui Nafis
 Maa Howa Nahj al-Balaaqah: It was published in 1933 (1352 AH) by "Al-Irfan" magazine in Syria-Sidon. This book was translated into Persian by Seyyed Abbas Mirzadeh Ahari and published in Tehran in the religious newspaper "Nedaye Hagh" and then many times under the title "What is Nahj al-Balagha?" published with an introduction by Ali Davani.
 Hall al-Mashaakil: In solving a thousand scientific and literary issues.
 Al-Fawayid
 Masih al-Injil aw Masih al-Quran: In rejection of the Christian beliefs about Jesus.
 Islam Brahmi: It is about converting to Islam by an Indian engineer who converted to Islam as a result of an argument with the author. Part of that debate was published in the first year of "Al-Murshid" magazine.
 Qasaari al-Kalam fi Qasaari al-Hikam
 Qasaar al-Hikam fi Qasaar al-Kalam
 Al-Baqiaat al-Saalihaat
 Al-Manaat fi Shorof al-Asbaat
 Minhaaj al-Haaj: Published in Baghdad.
 Noor al-Naazir fi Ilm al-Miraayaa va al-Manaazir
 Falsafat Hibatuddin
 Tebb ol-Zo'a'fa
 Al-Khataabah
 Al-Haadi ila al-Mahdi (a)
 Al-Shiat al-Naajiah
 Al-Tazkiratah li Ale Muhammad al-Khayyirah
 Al-Majaamie al-Asnaa Ashar
 Jabal Qaaf
 Al-Dalayel va al-Masaaeel: Of which five volumes have been published and apparently reach twenty volumes.
 Nataaej al-Tahsil
 Sabayek al-Afhaam
 Al-Majamie al-Baghdadiyah
 Ziwar ol-Muslimin: This book has been published in Arabic and Persian in Iran under the name of "Ad'iyat al-Quran", and recently reprinted as part of some books of prayers and recitations of the Quran by the publications of the Society of Seminary Teachers of Qom.
 Zabour al-Muslimin, dar Adiyat Quran Karim
 Al-Dukhaniyah: It is a treatise about smoking during fasting.
 Al-Tanbih: In the prohibition of resemblance [to infidels] which was published in 1922 (1340 AH) in Baghdad.
 Asqi al-Mashaarib: About shaving and lengthening the human mustache.
 Al-Taftish: It is a Persian treatise on the evils of shaving the beard, published twice, first in Najaf in 1922 (1340 AH) and again in 1924 (1342 AH) in Tabriz, and "Mirza Abu Turab Hedayi" has put it in order.
 Khotab fi al-Jihad va al-Ittihad
 Al-Sa'at al-Zuwaliyah
 Jannat al-Ma'wa fi al-Irshad ila al-Taqwa
 Tanziyah al-Tanzil min al-Taqyir va al-Tabdil
 Vazayef Zanan
 Al-Jaann va al-Jinn
 Al-Ruwayd
 Minhaj al-Salaf fi Tafriq al-Mokhtalif va al-Moetalif
 Tarjomeh Resaaleh Qadirieh

Articles 
 Asraar al-Sawrat aw Khawatir Sa'ah
 Ash'aar al-Quran be-Taharrok al-Arz
 Izhaar al-Wasi Taharrok al-Arz
 Ila min Yarid al-Ashiae Mahsusah
 Al-Baraahin ala Tajarrod al-Nafs
 Tasrih al-Din be-Kisrat Aqmaar al-Samaae
 Tafsir al-Quran al-Hakim: Tafsir Surah al-Waqi'a be-Qalam al-Allama Al-Sayyid Hibatuddin al-Shahrestani Damma Zillah
 Tanazoe al-Rouhiyah wa al-Maadiyah
 Siqaat al-Rowaat: Al-Sayyid Hibat al-Hussayni al-Shahrestani (1301-1386 AH)
 Al-Husayn.. al-Wasbat al-Mawqozah
 Al-Dalaael wa al-Masaael
 Ramadan Ramz Taqrib al-Qulub wa Talif al-Shu'oub

Eye disease 
Shahrestani was about forty years old (that is, in 1924 or 1342 AH) when he suffered from eye diseases and decreased vision. Surgery in 1926 (1345 AH) and hospitalization in Damascus did not result and he remained blind until the end of his life, 1967 (1386 AH). That is, he lives about half a century with the effects of low vision and blindness.

Death 
Shahrestani died on the night of Monday, 7 February 1967 (Shawwal 26, 1386 AH) at the age of 85 and was buried in the shrine of Musa al-Kadhim, Al-Kadhimiya Mosque, Kādhimayn, Baghdad, Iraq. Funeral ceremonies were held in Najaf, Karbala, Baghdad, Iran and other Islamic countries in respect of him.

Commemoration conference 
The conference in honor of Allamah Hibatuddin Shahrestani was held by the University of Kufa and The Islamic College of London on Wednesday and Thursday, March 31, 2010, and April 1, 2010, at the Faculty of Literature of the University of Kufa. In this conference, dozens of articles were presented by the professors of this university and a number of guests. The book "Sayyid Hibatuddin al-Hosseini al-Shahrestani, his life and scientific and social vitality (1301-1386 AH)" was commissioned by the Shiite Bibliographic Institute by the efforts of Sayyid Abdul Sattar al-Hassani al-Baghdadi. This book is the most extensive book in the biography of Hibatuddin Shahrestani.

See also 
 Abd al-Husayn Sharaf al-Din al-Musawi
 Muhammad Baqir al-Sadr
 Sadr al-Din al-Sadr
 Abdul-Karim Haeri Yazdi
 Abol-Ghasem Kashani
 Seyyed Mohammad Hojjat Kooh Kamari
 Mirza Jawad Agha Maleki Tabrizi
 Mohammad Hossein Esheni Qudejani
 Noureddin Esheni Qudejani
 List of deceased Maraji

References

External links
 Iraqi Shi'is and the Pressure of Religious Identity An Attempt to Determine the Meaning of Shi'i Identity
 Your Iraq is Najd and Saudi is Iraqi!

1884 births
1967 deaths
Iraqi Shia clerics
Shia scholars of Islam
Shia clerics
Pupils of Muhammad Kadhim Khorasani